Kim Hyun-chul (born August 27, 1970), is a South Korean comedian.

References

1970 births
Living people
South Korean male comedians
Seoul Institute of the Arts alumni